Bham dam is an earthfill gravity dam on the Bham tributary of Godavari river in Nashik district in the State of Maharashtra in India.

Specifications

Purpose
Irrigation

See also
 Dams in Maharashtra
 List of reservoirs and dams in India

References

Dams in Nashik district
Dams on the Godavari River
2007 establishments in Maharashtra